Umberto Vittori (22 December 1906 – ?) was an Italian rower. 

Vittori was born in Izola in 1906, which at that time belonged to Austria-Hungary. After WWI, the town was part of Italy and Vittori represented that country. He competed at the 1936 Summer Olympics in Berlin with the men's coxed four where they were eliminated in the semi-final.

References

1906 births
Year of death missing
Italian male rowers
Olympic rowers of Italy
Rowers at the 1936 Summer Olympics
People from Izola
European Rowing Championships medalists